The Suite en 3 mouvements in C major, FP 19, is a suite for piano by Francis Poulenc which contains three movements:

I    Presto
II   Andante
III  Vif

The suite was completed in March 1920 and was first performed on April 10 of the same year by pianist Ricardo Viñes in the Paris Conservatory. Along with the waltz he contributed to L'Album des Six, a project completed by members of Les Six, this suite marked a return to the anti-impressionist style for which Poulenc was known; a style which is more clear and airy and in the spirit of French Harpsichordists as well as the more traditional style of Scarlatti.

References

Bibliography
 

Compositions by Francis Poulenc
1920 compositions
Compositions for solo piano
Suites (music)